Mexican Renaissance refers to the Mexican muralism movement between 1920 and 1950. The phrase was first used in Idols behind Altars by Anita Brenner, with Jean Charlot. Charlot also discussed it in his 1963 book, The Mexican Mural Renaissance:

References

Mexican art